Asayîş or Asayish (Kurdish for security) is the Kurdish security organization and the primary intelligence agency operating in the Kurdistan region in Iraq. The organization was established in September 1993 and has been often referred to as an "intelligence agency", "security force", "security service", "security", "secret service", "secret police", or just "Kurdish police." Asayesh coordinates and shares information with Parastin u Zanyari, the investigative arms and intelligence gatherers operating in the Kurdistan region in Iraq.

It acts under the command of the Kurdish National Assembly and the Kurdistan Regional Government.

Its official goals according to the Kurdistan authority are:
 Counter-drug trafficking
 Counter-terrorism
 Counter-espionage
 Gathering intelligence
 Assessing threats to Iraq's national security.

The organization has jurisdiction over:
 Economic crimes
 Smuggling
 Political crimes
 Espionage
 Sabotage
 Terrorism.

Issues
In 2009 Amnesty International accused Asayesh of abusing human rights, including torture and other ill-treatment, and claimed that the agency was "above the law" in Iraqi Kurdistan. The Kurdistan Regional Government criticized Amnesty by stating:

See also
 List of armed groups in the Iraqi Civil War
 Kurdistan
 Peshmerga
 List of armed groups in the Syrian Civil War
Asayish (Rojava regions)

References

Iraqi intelligence agencies
Kurdistan Region (Iraq)
Law enforcement in Iraq
1993 establishments in Iraq
Government agencies established in 1993